United Alkali Company Limited was a British chemical company formed in 1890, employing the Leblanc process to produce soda ash for the glass, textile, soap, and paper industries. It became one of the top four British chemical companies merged in 1926 with Brunner Mond, Nobel Explosives and British Dyestuffs Corporation to form Imperial Chemical Industries.

History

United Alkali was formed on 1 November 1890 when 48 chemical companies from the Tyne, Scotland, Ireland and Lancashire were merged. These included Newcastle Chemical Works, Allhusen, Gateshead; Atlas Chemical of Widnes; Henry Baxter of St Helens; Gaskell, Deacon of Widnes; Globe Alkali of St Helens; Golding-Davis of Widnes; Irvine Chemical of Scotland; A G Kurtz of St Helens; James Muspratt of Widnes and Liverpool; Runcorn Soap and Alkali; Charles Tennant of St Rollox, Glasgow; Wigg Brothers and Steele of Runcorn. The merged companies were:

Following the merger of the companies, some concerns were raised about the impact on employment. In Robert Sherard's The White Slaves of England (1896) he quotes of the impact in Runcorn, where the Alkali factory previously employed about 500 men but fewer than ten after amalgamation.

See also 
 Tharsis Sulphur and Copper Company Limited

Bibliography 
 Fenton, Roy S. Mersey Rovers. World Ship Society, 1997.

References

External links
 Grace's Guide: United Alkali Co

Chemical companies established in 1890
Chemical companies of the United Kingdom
Companies based in Cheshire
Defunct manufacturing companies of the United Kingdom
History of Cheshire
Manufacturing companies established in 1890
Widnes
1890 establishments in England